José Adalid Puerto Lozano (born on September 14, 1979) is a Honduran football goalkeeper, who currently plays for Platense in the Liga Nacional de Fútbol de Honduras.

Club career
A Platense-player, Puerto also played for Real Juventud and Marathón. He was ruled out of the game for three years due to injury sustained while training with Marathón.

In that period he went to the USA and became a business man but surprisingly returned to the game to play for Platense again after starting the 2013 Clausura as goalkeeping coach but soon ended up as the team's number one goalkeeper.

International career
Puerto made his debut for Honduras in an August 2006 friendly match against Venezuela and has earned a total of 2 caps, scoring no goals. He was a non-playing squad member at the 2007 CONCACAF Gold Cup.

His other, final, international was an October 2006 friendly match against Guatemala.

References

External links

1979 births
Living people
People from Yoro Department
Association football goalkeepers
Honduran footballers
Honduras international footballers
2007 CONCACAF Gold Cup players
Platense F.C. players
C.D. Real Juventud players
C.D. Marathón players
Liga Nacional de Fútbol Profesional de Honduras players